Schwarzerium is a genus of long-horned beetle.

Species
Schwarzerium contains the following species:
 Schwarzerium andrea Skale, 2021
 Schwarzerium cyaneipes (Pic, 1946)
 Schwarzerium extremum Skale, 2021
 Schwarzerium fansipanense Skale, 2021
 Schwarzerium gerardi Skale, 2021
 Schwarzerium hagiangense Skale, 2021
 Schwarzerium hasuoi Niisato & Bentanachs, 2012
 Schwarzerium holzschuhi Skale, 2021
 Schwarzerium merkli Skale, 2021
 Schwarzerium provostii (Fairmaire, 1887)
 Schwarzerium quadricolle (Bates, 1884)
 Schwarzerium semivelutinum (Schwarzer, 1925)
 Schwarzerium tamdaoense Skale, 2021
 Schwarzerium viridescens Hayashi, 1982
 Schwarzerium viridicyaneum (Hayashi, 1956)

References

External links
 Encyclopedia of Life entry

Callichromatini